The Stadler GTW is an articulated railcar for local transport made by Stadler Rail of Switzerland.

History

The Biel–Täuffelen–Ins-Bahn near Bern, Switzerland was looking for a lighter train model to replace its aging fleet, so that a low floor system does not require heavy installations on the roof. Based on that requirement Stadler came up with a concept of placing most of the equipment in a central unit between the seating cars. While the BTI-Bahn tracks are meter gauge, Stadler presented the first prototype in 1995 set on standard gauge rails, and the Mittelthurgau-Bahn tested three prototypes on its standard gauge network during 1996. The rolling stock for Mittelthurgau was later expanded to 10 GTW 2/6 (built 1998–1999) that are now part of the THURBO fleet (the three prototypes were sold to Italy). The next lots were produced in meter gauge, and were delivered to the BTI-Bahn and the CEV-Bahn (Chemins de fer électriques Veveysans) in 1997 - although the BTI-Bahn was first to order any GTWs with its 7 trains, the CEV-Bahn ordered the biggest lot of the first generation with 20 trains.

In 1998 the Linzer Lokalbahn (Austria) placed an order which needed to be modified to conform to the DIN 5510 class 2 safety standard, as well as different electrification. These 8 trains were delivered in 2000 from the Swiss facilities and an option of 6 more trains was fulfilled in 2005. Another modification was done for the River Line (New Jersey) with an order of 20 DMUs delivered in 2002/2003 from the Swiss facilities.

During that time the Hessische Landesbahn (HLB) in Germany was also looking at the new system but actual procurement was delayed until the second generation. In the beginning, Stadler was cooperating with ADtranz/DWA im Germany with the initial batch produced in 1999 at DWA Bautzen (Saxony). Its headshape design follows the style of the Deutsche Bahn trains as they were already on production at DWA, and eventually the DB Regio services also ordered a batch of 30 trains of a similar type as the 30 trains ordered by the HLB (only the height of the low floor section differs). The full series were then manufactured at the new Stadler Pankow (Berlin) facilities being built in 2000 by a joint venture with ADtranz. Stadler acquired their shares in 2001 and the final vehicles were delivered from that plant in 2001 by Stadler alone.

The second generation can be easily distinguished by its round headshape made from FRP (glass-fiber reinforced plastic). These follow the DB design being produced since 2000 for other customers as well, for example a batch of 12 trains went to Athens (Greece) in meter gauge (ordered in 1999, delivered since 2003). With the second generation the available options for GTW trains expanded - meter gauge vehicles can be ordered in a  width and the standard gauge vehicles in a  width. Also the GTW 2/6 may be expanded with an additional bogie car making it a GTW 2/8.

The third generation has minor modifications to the head shape but the more important changes were made to the power module - the electric variant now has  (instead of up to ) and the diesel-electric variant is available as a DMU-2 with two generators instead of one. This allowed for increasing the maximum speed, which was a requirement of Italian customers; in Italy, this type is known as ATR 100.  The Vinschgerbahn (Bolzano) was the first to order twelve DMU-2 in 2004, extended by eight vehicles of the same type for the Udine-Cividale line (Padova), also in 2004. The DMU-2 concept impressed the Arriva operator in the Netherlands which ordered 43 trains in 2005 asking for some further developments - the modified type sold well to other operators in the Netherlands and abroad, both as DMU and EMU variants.

The fourth generation came along with new regulations in the EU that increased the crashworthiness requirements (see EN 15227).  Trains had to comply with these requirements by 2008 (see 2008/57/EC). This is the same year that much of the production was moved to the branch factory in Siedlce, Poland.

551 units have been sold until 2011 and are in use in Austria, France, Germany, Italy, the Netherlands, Slovakia, Switzerland and the United States.

Because of the crashworthiness requirements, the GTW gained weight over time. As a consequence, the manufacturer saw its biggest customers, Arriva and Connexxion, switch over to the Flirt models for the following deliveries in 2012. Only some replacements for diesel-electric and cog-wheel trains followed after that point in time. For those application areas Stadler introduced the WINK concept (or Flirtino) in 2018. Flirt and Wink are the next-generation models that can support updated crash worthiness requirements. Like Stadler's GTW family of multiple units, Wink has a central power module containing the energy generation, traction and auxiliary systems, while the frame and other parts are derived from the Flirt models.

Description

Stadler GTW is family of vehicles which differ externally, in the various designs of the head of the vehicle (from angular to streamlined), and also in the different designs and power units that drive them. They also come in different gauges and as rack railway vehicles. The basic version is the GTW 2/6, a railcar which conforms to UIC standards. "2/6" means "two of six axles are powered". The GTW 2/6 is used for example by Deutsche Bahn as Baureihe 646 (Series 646) and by Swiss railways as RABe 526.

The basic concept is rather unconventional: the car is driven by a central "power module", also known as a "powerpack" or a "drive container", powered on both axles.  Two light end modules, each with a bogie, rest on the power module, which produces useful traction weight on the driving axles. The end modules also use the space very effectively, although the railcar is divided into two halves by the power module. Most units have a path through the drive container for passenger access. The end modules can be delivered with standard pulling devices or buffer gears, or with central buffer couplings. They are built with a low-floor design except above the bogies and at the supported ends (more than 65% of the railcar is low-floor). All of the usual comforts to be expected in a modern local network railcar are provided, such as air conditioning, a multi-purpose room, vacuum toilets (in a washroom suitable for the disabled) and a passenger information system. The GTWs can be Diesel-electric or electric-powered (via overhead wires or third rail).

Although the traction is good for the powered bogies the concept has the same problem as other light railcars with the brakes on the non-powered axles having lower grip than traditional railcars. This has led to actual restrictions when leaves are on the rails as the wheel slide protection can not fully compensate the effect. The central power module has limits with heat dissipation as well which can lead into situations where the power output needs to be limited which is automatically done in this construction concept.

Propulsion
IGBT based traction converters together with asynchronous motors are used as drive units. The traction converters are manufactured by ABB at their site in Turgi, Switzerland and the motors by TSA Austria.

By inserting a middle car (also with only one bogie) on one side of the propulsion module, the GTW 2/6 is expanded to GTW 2/8. Instead of the middle car, another drive module can also be inserted. Between the two modules are then either a trailer passenger car (GTW 4/8) or two medium cars and partitions (GTW 4/12).  For operational flexibility up to four GTWs of the same pattern can be operated as a multiple unit.

Applications

France 

The Panoramique des Dômes in France uses 4 GTW 2/6 since opening in 2012.

Greece 
In Greece, TrainOSE operates two variants of the Stadler GTW 2/6 (known also incorrectly as railbus), owned by OSE. It is the main suburban DMU and there are two variants i.e. the metric and the standard gauge. The metric gauge variant (OSE class 4501) operates in the Suburban of Patras (Proastiakos) and the tourist line of Katakolo-Pyrgos-Ancient Olympia. The standard gauge variant (OSE class 560) operates on the regional service Athens-Lianokladi and the local Lianokladi-Lamia-Stylida line (which is referred to as Proastiakos Lamias). In the near future, it is expected they will operate on different lines due to the electrification of the main network and TrainOSE becoming one of the Ferrovie dello stato Italiane group's subsidiary which will cause a lot of changes to the Greek railways.

Italy 
In Italy GTW are used by some regional railways, and called ATR:
 ATR 100: Societá Automobilistica Dolomiti (SAD) Trentino Alto Adige
 ATR 110: Ferrovie Udine Cividale (FUC) Friuli
 ATR 110 - ATR 120: Sistemi Territoriali (ST) Veneto
 ATR 115 - ATR 125: Ferrovie Nord Milano Group Lombardia
 ATR 200: Ferrovie del Sud Est (FSE) Puglia

Netherlands 

The multinational transport company Arriva uses the diesels on the lines: Leer (Germany) - Groningen, Delfzijl - Groningen, Leeuwarden - Groningen, Roodeschool / Eemshaven - Sauwerd, Veendam - Zuidbroek, Leeuwarden - Stavoren, Leeuwarden - Harlingen Haven. From December 2012, Arriva is also using diesel GTW's on Arnhem-Winterswijk, Winterswijk-Zutphen and Zutphen-Apeldoorn.
The electrified GTW are used on the lines Dordrecht - Geldermalsen and since December 2012 also on Zwolle - Emmen.

Arriva Limburg uses electric GTW on the lines Kerkrade Centrum - Heerlen - Maastricht Randwyck, Heerlen - Maastricht,  and the diesels are used on the lines: Roermond - Venlo - Nijmegen.

Connexxion was using one electric GTW for the line: Barneveld Centrum - Amersfoort, This GTW is transferred to the Vechtdallijnen from Arriva, Connexxion is also using 9 diesel GTW's for the Breng concession starting December 2012.

Slovakia 

The Železničná spoločnosť Slovensko (ZSSK) Class 425.95 is used on the Tatra Electric Railway.  The design of these trains was derived from the GTW 2/6.

The ZSSK Class 495.95 trains are used on both the Tatra Electric Railway and the Štrbské Pleso–Štrba rack railway.

The ZSSK Class 840 trains also derived from the GTW 2/6 are in use on the normal-gauge railways in the Poprad region. According to ZSSK, Class 840 trains will also be used on the Bratislava—Komárno line from December 2020

Spain 
The Catalan government-owned Ferrocarrils de la Generalitat de Catalunya (FGC) purchased two diesel-powered, Iberian gauge trains for use on the Lleida–La Pobla Line. This allowed the service frequency to be increased from 4 to 10 trains per day between Lleida and Balaguer, and 1 to 4 per day between Lleida and La Pobla de Segur.
A third new set is scheduled to enter service by August 2021.

Switzerland 

The Swiss Federal Railways use a narrow version of the GTW 2/6 (RABe 520) on the Seetal railway line and between Lenzburg and Zofingen.

THURBO uses a large fleet of RABe 526 (GTW 2/6 and 2/8) on various lines in eastern Switzerland. Regionalverkehr Mittelland bought several GTW 2/6, which were later extended to GTW 2/8 and finally sold to the Swiss Federal Railways in 2013.

Various narrow gauge railways use GTWs: Chemins de fer du Jura, Biel–Täuffelen–Ins-Bahn, and the Transports Montreux–Vevey–Riviera.

United States

New Jersey 

 River Line
New Jersey Transit uses 20 GTW diesel light rail vehicles on the  River Line service between Trenton and Camden.  The diesel LRV offers a tighter turning radius than typical main line light rail vehicles (i.e. Siemens Desiro, Bombardier Talent, etc.) and thus is capable of street running, a capability used in the River Line between Walter Rand Transportation Center and Entertainment Center stations in Camden.

GTW trains are also planned to operate on SNJLR's Glassboro–Camden Line, currently in development.

Austin, Texas

The Capital Metropolitan Transportation Authority (CapMetro) in Austin, Texas, uses ten Diesel rail vehicles of the type GTW 2/6 on its  red line from Leander to Downtown Austin. CapMetro originally purchased 6 GTW DMUs from Stadler in 2005, but expanded their fleet to 10 units in 2017. The 4 newer units feature LED destination signs instead of flip-dot signs, a slightly tweaked paint scheme (to better match the MetroBus paint scheme), and an updated engine car design that features a rounded top rather than an angular top as found on the older DMUs.

Denton County, Texas

The Denton County Transportation Authority (DCTA), announced on May 20, 2009, that it would purchase 11 GTW 2/6 articulated diesel multiple units (DMUs) for DCTA's  corridor from Denton to Carrollton.  This line connects with the Dallas Area Rapid Transit (DART) Green Line which extends from the Pleasant Grove neighborhood in southeast Dallas to northern Carrollton. The contract includes an option for up to 25 additional GTWs.

East Bay, California 

In 2014, the Bay Area Rapid Transit District Authority ordered eight GTW 2/6 DMUs for the under-construction eBART standard gauge tracks (the rapid transit system uses a wide gauge) to Antioch, California with two options to procure six more. The first trains were delivered by June 2017, with revenue service starting in May 2018.

See also 
 Stadler FLIRT
 Nippon Sharyo DMU

References

External links 

 Stadler GTW
 Stadler GTW Articulated Railcars Info & Images

Stadler Rail multiple units
Articulated passenger trains
Multiple units of Switzerland
Diesel multiple units of the Netherlands